Thomas Henry Briggs (27 November 1923 – 10 February 1984) was an English professional footballer who played as a striker. He was born in Chesterfield, Derbyshire, and died in Grimsby, Lincolnshire. He still holds a record for scoring seven goals in a single match for Blackburn Rovers against Bristol Rovers.

Tommy started his career at Grimsby Town in 1947. In 1950 he signed for Coventry City but did not settle. He moved on to Birmingham City but did not settle there either, eventually arriving at Blackburn Rovers.  He played 194 games and scored 140 goals for Rovers before returning to Grimsby in 1958. He finished his career at Glentoran as player/manager.

He played and scored for the England B-team against Switzerland B in 1950.

Honours

Glentoran
Gold Cup Winners: 1960

References

1923 births
1984 deaths
Footballers from Chesterfield
Association football forwards
English footballers
England B international footballers
Plymouth Argyle F.C. players
Grimsby Town F.C. players
Coventry City F.C. players
Birmingham City F.C. players
Blackburn Rovers F.C. players
Glentoran F.C. players
English football managers
Glentoran F.C. managers